Izmaylovsky (masculine), Izmaylovskaya (feminine), or Izmaylovskoye (neuter) may refer to:
Izmaylovsky Regiment, a subdivision of the 1st Guards Infantry Division of the Imperial Russian Guard
Izmaylovskaya (Moscow Metro), a station of the Moscow Metro, Russia
Izmaylovskaya gang, a criminal organization in the Russian mafia
Izmaylovskoye Municipal Okrug, a municipal okrug of Admiralteysky District of St. Petersburg, Russia
Izmaylovsky (inhabited locality) (Izmaylovskaya, Izmaylovskoye), several rural localities in Russia

See also
Izmaylovsky Park
Izmaylov
Izmaylovo (disambiguation)